The Marine Station or Marine Terminal is a marine passenger terminal in the port of Sochi, Krasnodar Krai, Russia.

History 

It is listed as an object of cultural heritage of Russia of federal significance. The centre of the building is topped by a 71-meter three-tiered tower and spire made of polished stainless steel. They represent the four seasons and the four cardinal points. A fountain stands in front of the terminal, with a statue of the goddess of navigation.

Destinations
Vessels from the terminal sail to a number of destinations, including Batumi, Gagra, Trabzon, Novorossiysk, Yalta, and Sevastopol.

In popular culture 

A scene of the Soviet film The Diamond Arm was filmed at the main deep-water berths for cruise liners. It showed protagonist Semen Semenovich Gorbunkov's farewell to his family as he began his journey on the ship .

References

External links
 HDR photography marine station of Sochi
 Photos of Sochi marine station
 Site Sochi seaport

Ports and harbours of Russia
Buildings and structures in Sochi
Transport infrastructure completed in 1955
Cultural heritage monuments of regional significance in Krasnodar Krai
Ferry terminals in Russia
Transport in Krasnodar Krai